Nagaon is a beach town on the shores of the Arabian Sea, in the North Konkan region of Maharashtra, India.  It is located 9 km from Alibag and 114 km from Mumbai.
Nagaon beach is popular mainly because of its cleanliness, water sport activities. The beach is around 3 km long. There are a few small hotels in Nagaon as the rest of the area is privately owned. Best option to stay here to stay in cottages owned by local people.

Demographics
The Nagaon village has population of 4977 of which 2501 are males while 2476 are females as per Population Census 2011. In Nagaon village population of children with age 0-6 is 337 which makes up 6.77 % of total population of village. Average Sex Ratio of Nagaon village is 990 which is higher than Maharashtra state average of 929. Child Sex Ratio for the Nagaon as per census is 812, lower than Maharashtra average of 894.

Nagaon village has higher literacy rate compared to Maharashtra. In 2011, literacy rate of Nagaon village was 92.89 % compared to 82.34 % of Maharashtra. In Nagaon Male literacy stands at 95.98 % while female literacy rate was 89.81 %.

Transport

Road
One can reach Alibag via Panvel - Pen (30 km away), which is on the Mumbai (78 km away) - Goa highway. While traveling on the Mumbai-Goa highway (NH-17), keep going straight at Wadkhal (or Vadkhal) (instead of taking left fork that goes to Goa. The distance is approximately 114 km from Mumbai.

Railways
The nearest rail railway station is at Pen. Through Pen, it is connected to Panvel and onwards to Mumbai and the Indian Railways network.

Boat services

The nearest jetty is Mandwa from where catamaran/ ferry services are available to Gateway of India, Mumbai. Another port in the vicinity is Rewas, from where a ferry service is available to Bhau cha Dhakka in Mumbai. There is also a jetty at Custom Bandar from where fishermen in Alibag set sail.

References 

Konkan
Populated coastal places in India
Beaches of Maharashtra
Tips: How to select Agriculture in Nagaon Alibag.